Arnold Brecht (26 January 1884 – 11 September 1977) was a German jurist and one of the leading government officials in the Weimar Republic. He was one of the few democratically minded high-placed officials that opposed the Machtergreifung in 1933.

An alumnus of the University of Göttingen, Brecht served as a government official from 1918 to 1933. He was dismissed from his post shortly after the Nazi seizure of power, and emigrated to the United States. He became a lecturer at The New School, and also a foreign policy adviser to the United States government.

After World War II he returned to Germany and helped drafting the Basic Law for the Federal Republic of Germany. In 1959 he received the Federal Cross of Merit.

Brecht also made contributions to political science. Brecht's law is the academic basis for one of the components of the equalization payments between the states of Germany.

Selected publications

Further reading

1884 births
1977 deaths
People from Lübeck
Jurists from Schleswig-Holstein
Weimar Republic politicians
University of Göttingen alumni
The New School faculty
Commanders Crosses of the Order of Merit of the Federal Republic of Germany
Exiles from Nazi Germany